The 2022 Cheltenham Borough Council elections took place on 5 May 2022 to elect members of Cheltenham Borough Council in Gloucestershire, England. Half of the council was up for election.

Results

 35,574

Ward results
Incumbent councillors are denoted by an asterisk (*)

All Saints

Battledown

Benhall & The Reddings

Charlton Kings

Charlton Park

College

Iain Dobie was a sitting councillor for Warden Hill ward.

Hesters Way

Lansdown

Leckhampton

Oakley

Park

Pittville

Prestbury

Springbank

St Mark's

St Paul's

St Peter's

Swindon Village

Up Hatherley

Warden Hill

By-elections

Battledown

References

Cheltenham
Cheltenham Borough Council elections
2020s in Gloucestershire